Andrew Walker (29 May 1891 – 27 May 1964) was a footballer who played for Dundee and Chelsea. He was a versatile  player who played in the midfield and as a forward.

Honours

Chelsea
FA Cup: Runners Up  1915

References

1891 births
1964 deaths
Association football midfielders
Association football forwards
Scottish footballers
Dundee F.C. players
Chelsea F.C. players
FA Cup Final players